Senator Lyman may refer to:

Phineas Lyman (1716–1774), Connecticut State Senate
Samuel Lyman (1749–1802), Massachusetts State Senate
William Lyman (congressman) (1755–1811), Massachusetts State Senate